Olearia quercifolia, commonly known as oak-leaved olearia, is a species of flowering plant in the family Asteraceae, and is endemic to the Blue Mountains in New South Wales. It is a shrub with elliptic to egg-shaped leaves with the narrower end towards the base, and white and yellow daisy flowers.

Description
The edges of the leaves are lobed and the lower surface is covered with yellow, woolly hairs. Flowering occurs from July to December and the achenes are glabrous, the pappus with 27 to 42 long bristles.

Taxonomy and naming
Olearia quercifolia was first formally described in 1836 by Augustin Pyramus de Candolle in his Prodromus Systematis Naturalis Regni Vegetabilis, from an unpublished description of specimens collected by Allan Cunningham. The specific epithet (quercifolia) means "oak-leaved".

Distribution and habitat
Oak-leaved olearia grows in swampy places in the Blue Mountains of eastern New South Wales.

References

quercifolia
Flora of New South Wales
Plants described in 1836
Taxa named by Augustin Pyramus de Candolle